Mian Marz (also Romanized as Mīān Marz) is a village in Deylaman Rural District, Deylaman District, Siahkal County, Gilan Province, Iran. At the 2006 census, its population was 95, in 22 families.

References 

Populated places in Siahkal County